Jae Synth (born January 9, 1980) is an American music video director, music producer and disc jockey from Sacramento, California

Music production
Jae Synth's is best known for his R&B and rap beats but he also makes music that falls into the hip-hop genre. His influences stem from his interest and background in dubstep, drum and bass, raves and jungle music.

His first album, The Resume, featured T.I., Young Buck, Snoop Dogg, Mac Dre, Keak da Sneak, B-Legit, and Turf Talk.

His sophomore album, Synth City included features from E-40, San Quinn, Mac Dre, Mistah F.A.B., and The Jacka.

Radio career
In high school, Jae Synth had a radio show on KXHB, with his brother Tofu de la Moore, and later they had hosted a drum n' bass show on Power 105.5.

Video Film and Directing
Quickly becoming an Award Winning Director / Producer Jae Synth with Photo SYNTHesis Films. Releasing his 1st Music Video that he filmed and directed on 1/1/11, he now has over 200 Music Videos. Jae Synth has filmed Music Videos in places such as London, Amsterdam, Sweden, Atlanta, Nashville, California, Puerto Rico, etc. Jae Synth has established himself as a household name. Working with the likes of E40, Snoop Dogg, TI, Joyner Lucas, NBA Young Boy, Yo Gotti, Mozzy, Sada Baby, Dave East, Too Short, Dogg Pound, Kurupt, Trae tha Truth, Symba, Conway the Machine, Ice Cube, Bun B, OMB Peezy, Jabbawokkie, Dj Premier, Scarface, Keith the Sneak, MC Eiht, Burner, The Jakka, Larry June, Paul Wall, B-Legit, Yukmouth, Young Noble, Bubba Sparks and the list goes on. Jae Synth is a factor in the entertainment industry even working with famed actor/recording artist love and hip hop star Joseline Hernandez.

Discography
Albums
The Resume (2008)
Synth City (2009)

Mixtapes
60 Minute Suicide (2009)
DubSac (2009)
Next 1000 (by Tais, mixed by Synth; 2009)
Now You're in Reality (2010)

Awards
2009 Sacramento News & Review- Sammies winner for "Outstanding Producer"

References

External links
 kumsfm.com
 
 

Living people
American DJs
Record producers from California
American film producers
1980 births